Andrew Curtis (born 2 December 1972) is an English former professional footballer who played as a winger in the Football League for York City, Peterborough United and Scarborough, and in non-League football for Kettering Town and Scarborough.

References

1972 births
Living people
Footballers from Doncaster
English footballers
Association football wingers
York City F.C. players
Kettering Town F.C. players
Peterborough United F.C. players
Boston United F.C. players
Scarborough F.C. players
English Football League players